Waylla Qullu (Aymara waylla Stipa obtusa, a kind of feather grass, qullu mountain, "Stipa obtusa mountain", also spelled Huaylla Kkollu) is a mountain in the Bolivian Andes which reaches a height of approximately . It is located in the Potosí Department, Tomás Frías Province, Yocalla Municipality.

References 

Mountains of Potosí Department